Malaysian Deaf Sports Association also simply known as MSDeaf is the national governing body of deaf sports in Malaysia which was formed in 1993. It is also affiliated with the Comite International des Sports des Sourds since 1993. Despite its establishment in 1993, the sports council got recognition as the Deaf Sports Association of Malaysia from the government of Malaysia under the leadership of Najib Razak in 2018.

On 5 April 2018, the Malaysian government recognised the Malaysian Deaf Sports Association as the sole national federation to deal with the deaf sports after passing the amendment of National Sports Development Act which got approved in the parliament. The minister of Ministry of Youth and Sports, Khairy Jamaluddin presented the amendment of the National Sports Development Act to the parliament which was approved on 3 April, 2018.

Activities 
The Federation is responsible for sending the deaf sportspeople representing Malaysia at the Deaflympics since the 1993 Summer Deaflympics. The Malaysian Deaf Sports Association is also responsible for sending their athletes to compete at the Asia Pacific Deaf Games and in other internationally recognised sports events which are in accordance with the rules and regulations of the International Committee of Sports for the Deaf. (ICSD)

See also 

 Malaysia at the 2017 Summer Deaflympics

References 

Deaf sports organizations
1993 establishments in Malaysia
Deaf Sports
Parasports in Malaysia
Sports organizations established in 1993
Disability organisations based in Malaysia
Deaf culture in Malaysia